The 2011–12 Uruguayan Segunda División is the season of second division professional of football in Uruguay. A total of 13 teams will compete; the top two teams and the winner of the Championship play-offs are promoted to the Uruguayan Primera División.

Club information

Personnel and kits

Standings

Results

Promotion playoff

Promotion Playoff Finals
Huracán and Progreso qualified to the promotion playoff finals by winning their respectively matches by a single-elimination format, with each tie played over two legs.

First Leg

Second Leg

Progreso won the match via penalties and became promoted to the 2012–13 Primera División.

Top goalscorers

See also
2011–12 in Uruguayan football

Uruguayan Segunda División seasons
2011–12 in Uruguayan football
Uruguay
Uruguay